Sandra Jean Mackie (born 24 November 1959 in Hamilton, New Zealand) is a retired field hockey player from New Zealand, who was a member of the national team that finished sixth at the 1984 Summer Olympics in Los Angeles, California.

References
 New Zealand Olympic Committee

External links
 

New Zealand female field hockey players
Olympic field hockey players of New Zealand
Field hockey players at the 1984 Summer Olympics
1959 births
Living people
Sportspeople from Hamilton, New Zealand